Elections were held in the organized municipalities in the Sudbury District of Ontario on October 24, 2022 in conjunction with municipal elections across the province.

Baldwin

Jason Cote, Gerald Lepine, Ray Maltais and Bert McDowell were elected to council.

Chapleau

Chapleau was one of numerous municipalities in the province where there were no elections held; as each position on council saw only one registered candidate by the close of nominations, the entire council was directly acclaimed to office.

Councillors are Alex Lambruschini, Paul Bernier, Catherine Ansara and Lisi Bernier.

Espanola
Incumbent mayor Jill Beer did not run for re-election. Candidates that ran to replace her included former mayor Ron Piche and former councillor Maureen Van Alstine.

Angela Kelly, Aidan Kallioinen, John Nadeau, Sandra Hayden, Gerry Massicotte and Ken Duplessis were elected to council.

French River
Gisèle Pageau was re-elected mayor of French River by acclamation.

Killarney
The only contested race in Killarney was for Ward 1, with five candidates for the three seats. The mayor and both Ward 2 councillors were acclaimed.

The council will consist of Rob Campbell, Dave Froats and Peggy Roque in Ward 1, and Nicola Grubic and Mary Bradbury in Ward 2.

Markstay-Warren
Ned Whynott was elected as mayor of Markstay-Warren by acclamation.

Nairn and Hyman

Wayne Austin, Guy Despatie, Rod MacDonald and Trevor McVey were elected to council.

Sables-Spanish Rivers

Mike Mercieca, Harold Crabs, Edith Fairbairn, Cheryl Phillips and Casimir Burns were elected to council.

St. Charles
The following were the results for mayor of St. Charles.

References

Sudbury
Sudbury District